MMDA TeleRadyo was the official radio program of the Metropolitan Manila Development Authority. It gave traffic updates and news about the agency together through its radio station DWAN. The studios and facilities were located at EDSA, Makati. It was aired on channel 4 on Global Destiny Cable (now Destiny Cable).

MMDA TeleRadyo and DWAN-AM permanently ceased operations on August 17, 2010, in order to cost-cutting measures.

Programs and Personalities

See also
DWAN (defunct)
Metropolitan Manila Development Authority
DZRH News Television
One PH
ABS-CBN TeleRadyo
GMA News TV (defunct)
Inquirer 990 Television (defunct)

References

External links
Official Website

Television in Metro Manila
Mass media in Metro Manila
Defunct television networks in the Philippines
24-hour television news channels in the Philippines
Television networks in the Philippines
Television channels and stations established in 2008
Television channels and stations disestablished in 2010